Grand Ayatollah Naser Makarem Shirazi (born 25 February 1927 in Shiraz, Iran) is an Iranian Shia marja' and religious leader.

Biography
He was born in the city of Shiraz, Iran. According to his website, his father was Ali Mohammad, his grandfather was Mohammad Karim, his forefather was Mohammad Baqer and his progenitor was Mohammad Sadeq. According to Parvaneh  Vahidmanesh one of opponents of the Iranian regime, he has Jewish ancestors. He finished his school in Shiraz.

He started his formal Islamic studies at the age of 14 in the Agha Babakhan Shirazi seminary.
After completing the introductory studies, he started studying jurisprudence (fiqh) and its principles (usool al-fiqh).

He made rapid progress and finished studying the complete levels of introductory and both the levels of the intermediate Islamic studies in approximately four years. During this time, he also taught at the Islamic seminary in Shiraz.

At the age of 18, he formally entered the theological seminary of Qom, and for the next five years was present in the religious gatherings and classes of some of the leading Islamic teachers of those days, such as Ayatollah Muhammad Hussein Burujerdi, & Ayatollah Seyyed Kazem Shariatmadari.

In Najaf
In 1950, he made his way to the seminary of Najaf, Iraq. Here, he was able to take part in classes of teachers such as Ayatollah Muhsin al-Hakim, Ayatollah Abul-Qassim Khoei and Ayatollah Abdul Hadi ash-Shirazi.

At the age of 24, he was granted complete ijtihad by two senior scholars in Najaf. Ayatollah Muhsin al-Hakim also wrote a short, comprehensive letter of commendation for him.

In 1951, he returned to Qom, since he did not have the means to survive and continue his studies in Najaf.

After returning to Iran, Ayatollah Naser Makarem Shirazi began teaching the intermediate and higher level of studies in usul al-fiqh and fiqh. Also, he was a member of the editorial board of the first Islamic magazine published in Iran named "Maktab'e Eslam", next to Ayatollah Shariatmadari.

He has won the Iranian Royal Academy of Philosophy' award for his essay "Filsuf-Namaha".

Fatwas (Rulings) and Statements

Women's attendance in stadia

In the aftermath of an attempt by President Ahmadinejad to allow women to attend soccer matches in stadiums (something they are not able to do now), Makarem issued a fatwa objecting to this.

Alternatives to stoning
Makarem's fatwa concerning stoning to death for adultery reads: "In certain circumstances, death by stoning can be replaced by other methods of punishment".

Smoking
Makarem issued a fatwa declaring smoking as forbidden (Haram).

Dogs and pets
In 2010, he responded to a request inquiring why a dog is considered unclean under shariah despite a lack of any prohibition on keeping dogs as pets in the Quran. In his fatwa, he emphasized that under shariah, dogs are indeed considered unclean based upon riwayahs, reliable narrations (hadith) handed down from the Prophet Muhammad and his household. Makarem described the current Iranian inclination toward dogs as "blindly imitating the West"; something that he believes will result in "evil outcomes."

The Ministry of Culture and Islamic Guidance of Iran reacted to this fatwa by banning all advertisement related to keeping, buying, and selling pets.

Holocaust
In September 2010, he was quoted by the Islamic Republic News Agency (IRNA) as saying "The Holocaust is nothing but superstition, but Zionists say that people of the world should be forced to accept this. The truth about the Holocaust is not clear, and when the researchers want to examine whether it is true or the Jews have created it to pose as victims, they jail the researchers".

Underage marriage
In reference to marriage of girls under 13 years of age, which is allowed in Iran under certain circumstances, he has stated that, although such marriages were permitted in the past, in modern times it has been demonstrated that they are not in the best interest (maslahat) of the parties involved and should be considered invalid.

Gender Roles

On his official website, in a post about Men's Day, Makarem claims that the "key issue which is neglected by feminist movements" is that they "promote gender equality and they neglect the fact that the rights and responsibilities of human beings must suit their physical and psychological potentials and capabilities. When these capabilities are neglected, any law which is created for the regulation of human affairs will be sheer injustice."

Homosexuality
"Since the family is the building block of human society, such problems within the family can then extend to the society, creating social problems such as a decreased marriage rate, the spread of homosexuality, and sexual promiscuity."

Political career
Ayatollah Makarim Shirazi was active in the pre-revolution days, hence he was thrown in jail many times. He was even exiled on three separate occasions to three different locations-Chabahar, Mahabad and Anarak. After the Iranian revolution, he was appointed to the Assembly of Experts for construction and played a major role in writing the first constitution.  He is no longer a member of the government, and resides in the city of Qom. On November 23, 2014 and after months of preparations, he finally managed to gather in over 600 religious scholars from around the world in a conference titled The International Congress on Extremist and Takfiri Movements in the Islamic Scholars’ View. It was a meeting for discussing controversial issues effecting the Muslim world, especially Takfiri movements. After the first successful hosting in which he condemned the inaction in the face of ISIL atrocities, he decided to reorganize another conference, Extremism and Takfiri Movements in Today’s World on 28 January 2016, to further focus on the responsibilities of the Muslim scholars regarding the unwelcome emergence of extremism. At the second congress same as the first one, scholars of more than 80 countries received invitations and about one thousand people participated.

Selected bibliography
Some of his publications include:"
"
 the Message of Quran
 OUR BELIEF
 Khums the Fund of Independence of Bait Al Mal
 Quran Translation and Commentary in Brief
 Life under the Grace of Ethics
 Universal Government of Mahdi
 Islamic Law
 sexual problems of the youth
 Shia Answers
Commentary on the book Kifayatul Usul (at age 18)
The Manifestation of Truth‌
Commentary on the Quran (Tafsir Nemooneh)
The Message of the Quran
Anwar al-Fuqahah
al-Qawaidul Fiqhiyyah
The Limits of Azadari
They Will Ask You
50 Life Lessons from the Ahl al-Bayt (a)

See also

 Grand Ayatollahs
 List of current Maraji
 Qom
 Ijtihad
 Marja
Ali al-Sistani
Abu al-Qasim al-Khoei
Muhammad Hossein Naini 
Muhammad Kazim Khurasani
Mirza Husayn Tehrani
Abdallah Mazandarani
Mirza Ali Aqa Tabrizi
Mirza Sayyed Mohammad Tabatabai
Seyyed Abdollah Behbahani

References

External links

Online Quran Project includes the Qur'an translation by Naser Makarem Shirazi.
 His books online
His website
Biography

People from Shiraz
1927 births
Living people
Iranian grand ayatollahs
Iranian Holocaust deniers
Translators of the Quran into Persian
20th-century translators
Sex segregation and Islam
Society of Seminary Teachers of Qom members
Iranian people of Jewish descent
Members of the Assembly of Experts for Constitution
Grand ayatollahs
Critics of Wahhabism